Timothy Fuller (July 11, 1778 – October 1, 1835) was a U.S. Representative from Massachusetts.

Life and work
Fuller was born in Chilmark, Massachusetts.  His father, also named Timothy, the first settled minister of Princeton, Massachusetts, was third in descent, from Thomas, who emigrated from England in 1638. The younger Timothy received a classical education and graduated from Harvard University in 1801 with second honors.  He taught at Leicester Academy, then studied law with Levi Lincoln.  He was admitted to the bar and commenced practice in Boston. He served as member of the Massachusetts House of Representatives, as a State councilor and served in the Massachusetts State Senate from 1813 to 1816.

Fuller was elected as a Democratic-Republican to the Fifteenth through the Seventeenth Congresses and reelected as an Adams–Clay Republican to the Eighteenth Congress (March 4, 1817 – March 3, 1825). He served as chairman of the Committee on Naval Affairs in the Seventeenth Congress. He was distinguished as an orator, making effective speeches in behalf of the Seminole Indians, and against the Missouri compromise. He was an ardent supporter of John Quincy Adams, and published a pamphlet entitled "The Election for the Presidency Considered," which was widely circulated.

Fuller married Margaret Crane in 1809 and moved to 71 Cherry Street in Cambridgeport, Massachusetts. He was the father of early feminist Margaret Fuller and Unitarian minister Arthur Buckminster Fuller. Through the latter, he is also the great-grandfather of inventor and thinker Buckminster Fuller. and, through Arthur's brother Richard Frederick Fuller, the great-great-great-grandfather of US Treasury Secretary Timothy Geithner. He died suddenly of cholera, intestate and insolvent, in Groton, Massachusetts, on October 1, 1835, and was interred in Mount Auburn Cemetery in Cambridge.

References

1778 births
1835 deaths
Members of the Massachusetts Governor's Council
Massachusetts state senators
Members of the Massachusetts House of Representatives
Harvard University alumni
Burials at Mount Auburn Cemetery
Deaths from cholera
Democratic-Republican Party members of the United States House of Representatives from Massachusetts
People from Chilmark, Massachusetts